Ernest Bazanye is a Ugandan journalist, blogger, author, and scriptwriter. He is best known for his humour column Ernest Bazanye's Bad Idea, which ran in the Sunday Vision newspaper from 2004 to 2018. He is the author of three children's novels , and his short stories have appeared in literary magazines Eclectica, Kalahari Review, Soomanystories, and published in the Africa Book Club anthology. 

Bazanye has written humour and satire for The Daily Monitor, Suluzulu.com, Saraba Magazine, and is currently a weekly columnist with The Nile Post and The New Times of Rwanda. 

He contributed to political satire shows What's Up Africa and Business Unusual as a writer and wrote as well as hosted the political comedy panel show Muwawa Club on Urban TV. 

In 2015 his blog Shut Up I'm Thinking, was awarded best blog of the year at the Uganda Social Media Awards.

Novels

Bazanye, Ernest, Uncle Julius' Funeral, Fountain Publishers

Short fiction
"Brother Armand's Apostasy", in 
"LHR to EBB", Kalahari Review
"You Never Learn" Eclectica.org
Halfaman, Eclectica.org
The Law of The Land, SoooManyStories.ug

References

External links 
"Ernest Bazanye’s Bad Idea: Facebook makes you stupid"
"Producing and Consuming African Literature: Ernest Bazanye and the Uganda Case"
"Ernest Bazanye: An Improvement On The Silence"

Living people
Ugandan writers
Makerere University alumni
Ugandan male short story writers
Ugandan short story writers
Ugandan novelists
Male novelists
Ugandan male writers
Kumusha
Year of birth missing (living people)